The Princeton University Department of Economics is an academic department of Princeton University, an Ivy League institution in Princeton, New Jersey. The department is one of the most premier institutions for the study of economics. It offers undergraduate A.B. degrees as well as graduate Ph.D. degrees.  It is considered one of the "big five" schools in the field along with the faculties at the University of Chicago, Harvard University, Stanford University, and MIT. According to the 2018 U.S. News & World Report, the department ranks as joint No. 1 in the field of economics.

The department is located in the Julis Romo Rabinowitz Building & Louis A. Simpson International Building, formerly 20 Washington Road, which also houses the Princeton Institute for International and Regional Studies, the Bendheim Center for Finance, the Center for Health and Wellbeing, and the Julis-Rabinowitz Center for Public Policy and Finance. It is also home to the Industrial Relations Library.

History
Since the university's founding in 1746, many courses in the social sciences, including history and politics, were taught in the department of Jurisprudence and Political Economy. Coursework specifically in political economy became available in 1819. When Woodrow Wilson became a professor in 1890, additional courses were added to the curriculum, including the History of Political Economy. By 1913, the department became independent from history and politics, forming the Department of Economics and Social Institutions.

Academics

The undergraduate program is one of the most prestigious programs for the study of economics in the country and in the world. Economics is the most popular concentration (Princeton's version of an academic major) at the undergraduate level. Because the university does not have a business school, the economics concentration attracts many students who are interested in careers in investment banking, management consulting, finance, technology, and more. The curriculum itself is theoretical in nature, requiring students complete quantitative courses up to multivariate calculus. In partnership with the Bendheim Center for Finance, the department also offers an Undergraduate Finance Certificate.

The graduate program in economics trains Ph.D. students for careers in academia, government, and industry. It receives approximately 800 applications for a class of 20 to 25 students who come from over 30 different countries around the world. The program has numerous fields of specialization and has been particularly strong in the areas of Macroeconomics, Industrial Relations, and International Finance. Graduate students who pursue academic careers have historically had placement records at some of the world's leading universities including Harvard, Yale, MIT, and Cornell.

The department also oversees a number of centers and initiatives, including:

 Bendheim Center for Finance
 The Benjamin H. Griswold III, Class of 1933, Center for Economic Policy Studies
 The Gregory C. Chow Econometric Research Program
 Julis-Rabinowitz Center for Public Policy and Finance
 Center for Health and Wellbeing
 William S. Dietrich II Economic Theory Center
 Industrial Relations Section
 International Economics Section
 Office of Population Research
 Political Economy Program
 Princeton Experimental Laboratory for the Social Sciences (PExL)
 Research Program in Development Studies
 The Gregory C. and Paula K. Chow Macroeconomic Research Program
 Louis A. Simpson Center for the Study of Macroeconomics

Rankings

National Rankings
The 2018 U.S. News & World Report places the department as No. 1 in the field of Economics, tied with Harvard University, Massachusetts Institute of Technology, Stanford University, University of California Berkeley, and Yale University. The National Research Council's rankings place the university at No. 2 in the S-Rank (Scholars Rank) and No. 2 in the Research Rank.

International Rankings
In the 2018 Q.S. World University Rankings, the department places as No. 3 in the world in the fields of Economics and Econometrics. The 2018 Times Higher Education World University Rankings ranks the department as No. 7 globally. It has been ranked by RePEc among the top ten economics Departments in the world.

Notable faculty

Nobel Memorial Prize in Economic Sciences 
Among the department's past and current faculty members are several recipients of the Nobel Memorial Prize in Economic Sciences:

Other notably past and present faculty members include:
 Mark Aguiar
 Orley Ashenfelter
 Alan Blinder, the 15th Vice Chairman of the Federal Reserve 
 Markus Brunnermeier
 Roland Bénabou
 Leah Platt Boustan
 Markus Brunnermeier
 Anne Case
 Janet M. Currie 
 Henry Farber
 John Kenneth Galbraith, a leading academic on post-Keynesian economics; former United States Ambassador to India
 Mikhail Golosov
 Gene Grossman
 Faruk Gül
 Kate Ho
 Bo E. Honoré
 Nobuhiro Kiyotaki
 Henrik Kleven
 Ilyana Kuziemko
 Alexandre Mas
 Atif Mian
 Wolfgang Pesendorfer
 Stephen J. Redding
 Uwe Reinhardt, a scholar on health care economics and Medicare 
 Richard Rogerson
 Esteban Rossi-Hansberg
 Cecilia Rouse, the 30th Chair of the Council of Economic Advisers 
 Harold Tafler Shapiro
 Mark W. Watson
 Wei Xiong
 Leeat Yariv
 Motohiro Yogo

See also
MIT Department of Economics
Chicago School of Economics
Paris School of Economics
London School of Economics
University of Pennsylvania Economics Department
University of Rochester Economics Department

References

External links
 

Princeton University
Educational institutions established in 1913
Economics schools
University departments in the United States
1913 establishments in New Jersey